Jessie McPherson Private Hospital is a private hospital co-located with Monash Medical Centre in the Melbourne suburb of Clayton. It provides private health care to people in Melbourne, regional Victoria, interstate and overseas.

History
Jessie McPherson Private Hospital was first established in December 1930 in a central Melbourne church hall when a group of female doctors recognised the need for a new hospital to treat the city's ailing female population. The hospital became a reality when the then Premier of Victoria, Sir William McPherson donated £25,000 to build a hospital in memory of his mother, Mrs Jessie McPherson. The hospital was built adjacent to the old Queen Victoria Hospital in William Street in Melbourne's CBD and was named Jessie McPherson Community Hospital.

Subsequently, the Queen Victoria Hospital management was ordered by the then government to transfer its control over Jessie McPherson Community Hospital, so that the Cancer Institute could set up a new treatment centre in that location.

The hospital later moved to the intermediate section of the Queen Victoria Hospital in Lonsdale Street.

In 1987, the hospital moved to its present home in Clayton and is co-located with Monash Health's Monash Medical Centre. The Queen Victoria Hospital moved at the same time, becoming part of the Monash Medical Centre.

Services
Jessie McPherson Private Hospital provides the following speciality services:
 Maternity
 Gynaecology
 Cardiology and Cardiothoracics
 Gastrosciences and Endoscopy
 Neuroscience
 Vascular surgery
Cardiology services are offered in collaboration with MonashHeart formerly known as Department of Cardiology, Monash Medical Centre.

Notable births
 Cate Blanchett, 14 May 1969
Edward A G Richards, 23 June 1937
Christopher Webster, 12 May 2000

See also
 Healthcare in Australia

References

External links

Hospitals in Melbourne
Private hospitals in Australia
Hospitals established in 1930
1930 establishments in Australia
Buildings and structures in the City of Monash